The 1984 Michigan State Spartans football team represented Michigan State University in the 1984 Big Ten Conference football season. In their second season under head coach George Perles, the Spartans compiled a 6–6 overall record (5–4 against Big Ten opponents) and finished in a tie for sixth place in the Big Ten Conference.

Six Spartans were recognized by the Associated Press (AP) and/or the United Press International (UPI) on the 1984 All-Big Ten Conference football team: linebacker Jim Morrissey (AP-2; UPI-1); defensive back Phil Parker (UPI-1); running back Carl Butler (UPI-2); center Mark Napolitan (AP-2); defensive lineman Kelly Quinn (AP-2; UPI-2); and placekicker and punter Ralf Mojsienenko (AP-2; UPI-2).

Schedule

Personnel

Season summary

Notre Dame

at Michigan

Ohio State

at Iowa

vs. Army (Cherry Bowl)

References

Michigan State
Michigan State Spartans football seasons
Michigan State Spartans football